Granicus was an American hard rock band formed in 1969 in Cleveland. After performing in clubs in Cleveland, and then playing before label bosses, the band were then later signed by RCA Records on March 15, 1973 and released their eponymous debut album in the same year.
The band later opened for such performers as Bob Seger, Cactus and Spirit to promote that first record, which has since been critically acclaimed in some classic rock circles.
Soon after, though, the group disbanded, feeling unsupported by their label and being deserted by their manager. 
Most of the group later reunited, some 25 plus years later, after finding their first record pirated and selling in Europe. In 2009, they released Thieves, Liars and Traitors on an independent label in 2010. from a collection of unreleased material recorded in 1974. A third record, Better Days, has also since been released independently.
The group was known for their mix of heavy blues rock, progressive rock, psychedelic rock and heavy metal.

Initially formed by guitarist Al Pinell and drummer Joe Battaglia, the group would practice in his home before moving to a Cleveland warehouse to develop what would be their first record. The group's music was highly influenced by popular bands of the time, including late-60s psychedelic rock artists such as Cream, The Jimi Hendrix Experience and Blue Cheer as well as early-70s hard rock giants, Deep Purple and Led Zeppelin. The band featured two guitars, with bass and drums, and were led by a signature vocal. Lead vocalist Woody Leffel had a high-ranged delivery very similar to Robert Plant, Ian Gillan and Geddy Lee.

In 2016, the band  made a third recording, and were attempting to regain control of their since-pirated first record. Three members of the original group, Battaglia, Pinell and Bedford, teaming up again with guitarist Artie Cashin and bringing in vocalist Gerry Schultz. Leffel opted not to work on the third record. The band's second and third records are available on CDBaby.com

Members 

Principal members
Woody Leffel – vocals, acoustic guitar, harmonica
Wayne Anderson – lead guitar
Allen Pinell – rhythm guitar
Dale Bedford – bass guitar
Joe Battaglia – drums
Howard Ross - lead guitar

Guest artists on "Thieves, Liars and Traitors"
Artie Cashin – guitar
Jesse Rae – vocals

Granicus III, Better Days:
Gerry Schultz - vocals

Discography 

 Granicus (1973)
 You're In America
 Bad Talk
 Twilight
 Prayer
 Cleveland Ohio
 Nightmare
 When You're Movin Paradise

 Thieves, Liars and Traitors (2010)
 Thieves Liars and traitors
 Space in Time
 Equator
 I'm Not Sick
 Hollywood Star
 Wizard of Was
 Taste of Love
 Slings and Arrows
 When You're Movin'/Back Seat of My Car/Bad Talk (Live Jam)

 Granicus III, Better Days''' (2016)

 Better Days (title track)
 Southbound Walk Free Living In Darkness On The Road Again Gotta Win Tonight Take Me Back Give And Take Still Wanna Rock It''.

References 

https://www.cdbaby.com/Artist/Granicus

External links 
 LA Weekly website 
 https://www.amazon.com/Stairway-Hell-Chuck-Eddy/dp/030680817X
" The 500 best heavy metal albums in the Universe ", pg. 116
 http://teamrock.com/feature/2016-06-17/the-10-greatest-obscure-metal-bands-from-the-1970s-who-should-have-been-huge

American hard rock musical groups
Musical groups from Cleveland
Musical groups established in 1969
Musical groups disestablished in 1973
Rock music groups from Ohio